
Year 311 BC was a year of the pre-Julian Roman calendar. At the time, it was known as the Year of the Consulship of Brutus and Barbula (or, less frequently, year 443 Ab urbe condita). The denomination 311 BC for this year has been used since the early medieval period, when the Anno Domini calendar era became the prevalent method in Europe for naming years.

Events 
 By place 
 Seleucid Empire 
 Seleucus reestablishes himself as satrap of Babylonia and asserts control over Media and Susiana (Elam).

 Asia Minor and Syria 
 Ptolemy tries to occupy Syria. However, Demetrius Poliorcetes wins a battle over Ptolemy's forces and Antigonus enters Syria in force. So, after only a few months, Ptolemy evacuates his forces from Syria.
 In view of the threat by Seleucus to his control of the East, Antigonus decides to make peace with all of his adversaries, except Seleucus, who now holds Babylon. All of the diadochi confirm the existing boundaries and the freedom of the Greek cities. Ptolemy and Lysimachus are confirmed as satraps of Egypt and Thrace, respectively, and Antigonus and Cassander are confirmed as commanders of the army in Asia and Europe. Antigonus, no longer regent but now titled the strategos (officer in charge) of the whole of Asia, rules in Syria from the Hellespont to the Euphrates, including Asia Minor.
 It is agreed by all parties that the young king Alexander IV of Macedon, son of Alexander the Great, will become king of the whole empire when he comes of age in six years' time.
 The peace agreement between the diadochi is soon violated. On the pretext that garrisons have been placed in some of the free Greek cities by Antigonus. Ptolemy and Cassander renew hostilities against him.

 Sicily 
 The Carthaginian general Hamilcar crosses the Mediterranean with an army and wins the Battle of Himera against Agathocles, the tyrant of Syracuse.
 Hamilcar then proceeds with laying siege to Syracuse, where Agathocles had retreated.

Births

Deaths

References